Hugó Payr (24 August 1888 – 18 May 1976) was a Hungarian wrestler. He competed in the men's Greco-Roman light heavyweight at the 1908 Summer Olympics.

References

External links
 

1888 births
1976 deaths
Hungarian male sport wrestlers
Olympic wrestlers of Hungary
Wrestlers at the 1908 Summer Olympics
Martial artists from Budapest